The Suzuki GS1100 is a Suzuki GS series motorcycle introduced in 1980. It was a direct descendant of the Suzuki GS750. The engine size increased from 1000 to 1100 cc. Upon its introduction it received accolades.

Specifications 

 Four valves per cylinder
 Double overhead cam
 Electronic ignition
 Five-speed transmission
 Box-section aluminum swingarm
 Anti-dive forks (from 1982)
 Triple disc brakes

Recognition

Cycle World'''s Superbike of the Year for three consecutive years from 1981-1983.Cycle Guide'' said in March 1978, "Technologically, the GS1000 is a landmark motorcycle. It represents the first time … that an existing Japanese motorcycle has been successfully re-engineered with two important factors uppermost on the priority sheet: handling and light weight."

In 1999 Rider magazine ranked the GS1100E fifth on its list of the most significant bikes of the last 35 years.

Notes

GS1100
Standard motorcycles
Motorcycles introduced in 1980